The Las Vegas Outlaws were an American football team in the XFL. They played in the Western Division with the Los Angeles Xtreme, San Francisco Demons and Memphis Maniax.  They played their home games at Sam Boyd Stadium. On February 3, 2001, The Outlaws hosted the first nationally televised XFL game on NBC against the New York/New Jersey Hitmen.

History

Before the 2001 season began there was already question if Las Vegas could support a professional sports team due to past failed attempts with: Las Vegas Americans (Soccer-MISL- 1984-85), Las Vegas Dustdevils (Soccer-CISL-1994-1995), Las Vegas Posse (Football-CFL-1994) Las Vegas Quicksilvers (Soccer-NASL-1976-1978), Las Vegas Seagulls (Soccer-ASL-1979), Las Vegas Sting (Football-Arena Football League-1994-1995) and Las Vegas Thunder (IHL-1993-1999) The Outlaws were sponsored by Cox Communications, New York-New York Hotel & Casino, Station Casinos, PacifiCare Health Systems and Findlay Toyota.  Just like the Posse (and the later Locomotives), the Outlaws had a difficult time selling tickets. For the home opener against the Hitmen 13,700 tickets were sold for a stadium that seats 36,000. There were only 7,000 estimated season ticket holders. Compared to the rest of the league, the Outlaws' attendance was about average, at 22,000 fans per game. They were one of two teams (the league-leading San Francisco Demons being the other) to consistently play in a stadium that was more than half full.  The league-leading defense, led by Defensive Coordinator Mark Criner, was nicknamed "The Dealers of Doom."

Players
Among the team's players were the XFL's most well-known, Rod Smart (later with the National Football League's Philadelphia Eagles, Carolina Panthers, and the Oakland Raiders), who went by the nickname of "He Hate Me", which appeared on the back of his jersey. (He was originally going to put "They Hate Me", but there wasn't enough room.) Coached by former Boise State and Scottish Claymores head coach Jim Criner, the Outlaws competed in the XFL's only season, held in the spring of 2001. The team encouraged their fans to come up with a nickname. They selected the "Dealers of Doom Defense".  After a strong start, the Outlaws suffered repeated injuries to their quarterbacks (by the midpoint of the season they were on their fourth-string quarterback) and lost their last three games to finish in last place in the division with a record of 4-6-0, just one game out of a playoff spot.

Despite having a two-year contract, NBC announced shortly after the season that it was getting out, as the season's later games had garnered the lowest ratings for a major American television network since the Nielsen ratings had begun tracking them, and the league folded shortly afterwards.

The team was the centerpiece of the 2003 book about the XFL, Long Bomb: How the XFL Became TV's Biggest Fiasco.  It was written by Brett Forrest of Details magazine.

Notable Las Vegas Outlaws players
87 Werner (Verne) Hippler, a German-born tight end who played 11 years in the NFL Europe League and has also been on the practice squads of the San Diego Chargers and Detroit Lions.
10 Mike Cawley (James Madison) - The quarterback played in the NFL for five seasons with four teams, a season in the CFL with two teams, a season in NFLE with the Amsterdam Admirals, and one year with the Af2 Quad City Steamwheelers.
81 Todd Floyd (UNLV) - The wide receiver played for the Frankfurt Galaxy of NFLE and was on the preseason rosters of the Jacksonville Jaguars and Buffalo Bills.
22 Chrys Chukwuma(Arkansas) -The running back was briefly on the Dallas Cowboys' roster.
30 Rod Smart (Western Kentucky) - "He Hate Me" would go on to become the first former XFL player to appear in a Super Bowl: Super Bowl XXXVIII for the Panthers.
82 Mike Furrey (Ohio State/Northern Iowa) - Like Smart, the receiver has enjoyed a long NFL career.
17 Paul McCallum - Kicker who played for NFLE's Scottish Claymores. Most recently played in 2016 as a member of the BC Lions franchise, in the Canadian Football League; McCallum was the last active former XFL player in any professional league.
92 Kelvin T.G. Kinney (Virginia State) - The defensive end has spent time with the Detroit Lions and Washington Redskins.
31 Kelly Herndon (Toledo) - The cornerback later landed with the Seattle Seahawks.  In Super Bowl XL, he returned an interception for a then record of 76 yards. Since then it has been broken by Pittsburgh Steelers linebacker James Harrison.
16 Mark Grieb - The quarterback would go on to win two ArenaBowls with the San Jose SaberCats.  In the XFL, Grieb only got his chance when the starting quarterback Ryan Clement was injured.

Season-by-season

|-
|2001 || 4 || 6 || 0 || 4th Western || --
|}

Schedule

Regular season

Personnel

Staff

Standings

Team leaders
Rushing yards: 555, Rod "He Hate Me" Smart
Receiving yards: 273, Yo Murphy
Passing yards: 804, Ryan Clement

References

 
American football teams in the Las Vegas Valley
XFL (2001) teams
2001 establishments in Nevada
2001 disestablishments in Nevada
American football teams in Nevada